Anna Grönlund Krantz (born 1971) is a Swedish Liberal People's Party politician. She was a member of the Riksdag from 2002 until 2006.

External links
Anna Grönlund Krantz at the Riksdag website

Members of the Riksdag from the Liberals (Sweden)
Living people
1971 births
Women members of the Riksdag
Members of the Riksdag 2002–2006
21st-century Swedish women politicians